"Djobi, Djoba" is a hit song by the Gipsy Kings, a French-Calé rumba flamenca band. It was initially released in 1982 as an acoustic version on their debut album Allegria. In 1987, the song was re-recorded and released as a single. This version is from their self-titled third album. Along with other hits from the same album such as "Bamboléo" and "Un Amor", "Djobi Djoba" helped rocket the Gipsy Kings to European popularity, before they gained popularity in America in 1989. In 1989, Gipsy Kings was released in the US and it spent 40 weeks on the charts, one of very few Spanish language albums to do so.

Chart positions

References

External links
The Gipsy Kings discography, news (Music City)

1982 songs
1987 singles
Gipsy Kings songs